Estadio José Pérez Colmenares is a multi-purpose stadium in Maracay, Venezuela. The stadium was named in honor of first baseman and outfielder José Pérez Colmenares, a member of the National Baseball team that won the Baseball World Cup in its 1941 edition.

It is used mostly for baseball games and serves as the home of the Tigres de Aragua, a member team of the Venezuelan Professional Baseball League. Located at Campo Elías Street in Maracay, the stadium holds 12,647 people and was opened in 1965.

The Aragua club is regarded as one of the most dominant forces since its inception in the league, winning nine championship titles, five of them between the 2003–04 and 2008–09 seasons. As a result, the attendance of the facility has been increasing yearly making necessary major improvements to the structure of the building and also for the 2006 Caribbean Series that took place between the cities of Maracay and Valencia.<

References

Extras
https://www.tigresdearaguabbc.com/estadio.php (in Spanish)

 

1965 establishments in Venezuela
Baseball venues in Venezuela
Buildings and structures in Aragua
Multi-purpose stadiums in Venezuela
Sport in Aragua
Sports venues completed in 1965